Linos Makwaza (born 4 December 1965) is a Zambian former footballer who played as a midfielder. He made 21 appearances for the Zambia national team from 1992 to 1995. He was also named in Zambia's squad for the 1990 African Cup of Nations tournament.

References

1965 births
Living people
Zambian footballers
Association football midfielders
Zambia international footballers
1990 African Cup of Nations players
Place of birth missing (living people)